R v Larsonneur (1933) was a case heard in the Court of Criminal Appeals of England and Wales that has been used to illustrate the applicability of actus reus to strict liability offences.

Facts 
Larsonneur, a French national was given permission to enter the United Kingdom with a number of conditions on her staying. After her arrival, these conditions were changed and she was ordered to leave the United Kingdom before 22 March 1933. She complied with the order and went to the Irish Free State. She was subsequently deported from Ireland and was forced to return to Holyhead on the 21 April 1933. On arrival, she was arrested and charged with breaching the Aliens Order 1920, which made it a criminal offence to be found in the United Kingdom.

Appellate decision 
The appellant's lawyer, Marston Garsia, argued that "the mere fact of being found in the United Kingdom after the time of her departure therefrom had expired was not in itself an offence, unless it could be proved in addition that she landed in the United Kingdom in contravention of Art. 1. Here the evidence showed that she had not landed at all, but that she had been landed by a superior force over which she had no control".

Lord Hewart CJ dismissed the appeal and sided with the Crown who argued that how Miss Larsonneur got to the United Kingdom "makes no difference at all".

Criticism 
The decision to apply strict liability has attracted critique as it gives rise to criminal liability even when one's actions are involuntary. A similar set of facts occurred in the case of Winzar v Chief Constable of Kent (1983).

See also 

 Terrorism Act 2000, which introduced a strict liability offence of belonging to a proscribed terrorist organisation

Further reading 
 D. Husak, Philosophy of Criminal Law (Oxford University Press, 1987), p. 102

References 

1933 in case law
1933 in the United Kingdom